Tabilautide is an immunological agent.  It was studied as a potential drug for the treatment of cancer, but development for this purpose has been discontinued.

References

Carboxamides
Abandoned drugs